San Miguel Santa Flor is a town and municipality in Oaxaca in south-western Mexico. The municipality covers an area of 38.27 km². 
It is part of Cuicatlán District in the north of the Cañada Region. It received its name as its first settlers cultivated many flowers.

As of 2005, the municipality had a total population of 795.

References

Municipalities of Oaxaca